Scopula fuscata is a moth of the family Geometridae. It was described by George Duryea Hulst in 1887. It is found in North America from south-western Saskatchewan west to British Columbia and south to California and Arizona. The habitat consists of montane areas, including foothills.

The wings and body are light tan, sprinkled with darker yellow-brown or grey-brown scales. There is one generation per year with adults on wing in late June and early July in the northern part of the range.

Taxonomy
The name Scopula fuscata is a junior secondary homonym of Phalaena fuscata described by Johan Christian Fabricius in 1794 and requires a replacement name.

References

Moths described in 1887
fuscata
Moths of North America